Typical Rick is an American television series produced by Comedy Central, created by Nicholaus Goossen and Nick Swardson. Comedy Central declined to renew the series for a third season.

Cast
 Nick Swardson as Gary
 Simon Rex as Rick
 Megan Stevenson as Amy
 Chris D'Elia as Lukee Sado
 Alana Johnston as Juice Bar Bianca 
 Alessia Sushko as Alessiaa

References

External links
 

2010s American comedy television series
2016 American television series debuts
Comedy Central original programming